Ghaith Abdul-Ahad (Arabic: غيث عبدالأحد, born 1975) is an Iraqi journalist who began working after the U.S. invasion. Abdul-Ahad has written for The Guardian and The Washington Post and published photographs in The New York Times, The Washington Post, Los Angeles Times, The Guardian, The Times (London), and other media outlets. Besides reporting from his native Iraq, he has also reported from Somalia, Sudan, Afghanistan, Libya and Syria.

Abdul-Ahad has received the Martha Gellhorn Prize for Journalism, the James Cameron Memorial Trust Award, the British Press Awards' Foreign Reporter of the Year and the Orwell Prize.

Background
Abdul-Ahad was born in Baghdad, Iraq in 1975. He studied architecture at Baghdad University and had never traveled outside Iraq prior to the 2003 invasion of Iraq. As a deserter from Saddam Hussein's Iraqi army, he lived underground in Baghdad for six years, having to change his residence every few months in order to avoid detection and arrest.

He began doing street photography in 2001 and was determined to document conditions in Baghdad during the war. This aroused suspicion, and he was arrested three days before the end of major combat operations, though he was able to escape by bribing his guards.

Career
After the 2003 invasion of Iraq, Abdul-Ahad became a freelance photographer for Getty Images and journalist, writing for the British The Guardian from 2004.

In October 2005, he published his book Unembedded: Four Independent Photojournalists on the War in Iraq which features his photography along with that of Kael Alford, Thorne Anderson and Rita Leistner.

In October 2010 Abdul-Ahad was imprisoned for five days by the Taliban fighters he had gone to interview.

In late February 2011 Abdul-Ahad entered Libya to report on the Libyan civil war. He was detained on 2 March by the Libyan Army in the town of Sabratha. His traveling companion, the Brazilian journalist Andrei Netto of O Estado de S. Paulo was released on 10 March, with Netto attributing his release to the good relationship between Brazil and Libya. On 13 March Amnesty International and others called for Abdul-Ahad to be released; he was finally released on 16 March, after the Turkish government assisted negotiations and editor Alan Rusbridger flew to Tripoli.

Abdul-Ahad's most recent work revolves around the Syrian Civil War focusing on the rebels and their stalemate between determined loyalists.

Awards
 Martha Gellhorn Prize for Journalism, 2005
 James Cameron Memorial Trust Award, 2007
 British Press Awards Foreign Reporter of the Year, 2008
The Orwell Prize for Journalism, 2014
News & Documentary Emmy Awards for Best Story in a News Magazine and Outstanding Coverage of a Breaking News Story in a News Magazine, 2017

See also
List of solved missing person cases

References

External links 
 

1975 births
2010s missing person cases
21st-century Iraqi journalists
British people of Iraqi descent
Formerly missing people
Living people
People of the Iraq War
University of Baghdad alumni
Writers from Baghdad